These are the Billboard magazine number-one albums of 1978, per the Billboard 200.

Chart history

See also
1978 in music
List of number-one albums (United States)

References

1978
1978 record charts